If My Ancestors Could See Me Now is the first solo album by Ivan Neville.

The album had a top 30 hit on the Billboard Hot 100 with the first single, "Not Just Another Girl", when the song reached number 26 on the chart. The second single, "Falling Out of Love", a duet with Bonnie Raitt, reached number 91 on the Hot 100.

Track listing
All tracks composed by Ivan Neville; except where indicated
"Sun" - 4:29
"Primitive Man" - 3:47
"Not Just Another Girl" - 4:10
"Falling Out of Love" - 3:44
"Out in the Streets" (David Weber) - 4:28
"Money Talks" (Steven Stewart) - 4:42
"Never Should Have Told Me" - 3:28
"Up to You" - 3:40
"Another Day's Gone By" (Kevin Walsh, Vance DeGeneres) - 3:36
"After All This Time" (Leo Nocentelli) - 4:38

Personnel
Ivan Neville - keyboards, vocals, guitar on "Up to You", drum programming on "Falling Out of Love", bass on "Not Just Another Girl" and "Money Talks", piano on "Out in the Streets"
Danny Kortchmar - guitar, additional keyboards and bass on "Primitive Man", saxophone on "Not Just Another Girl", drum programming on "Falling Out of Love"
Waddy Wachtel - guitar
Randy Jackson - bass
Jeff Porcaro - drums, Latin percussion on "Primitive Man"
Steve Jordan - drums on "Primitive Man" and "Money Talks"
Jim Keltner - percussion on "Primitive Man" and "Falling Out of Love"
Bonnie Raitt - vocals on "Falling Out of Love"
John David Souther - vocals on "Another Day's Gone By"
Aaron Neville - vocals on "After All This Time"
Jason Neville - vocals on "Sun"
James "Hutch" Hutchinson - bass on "After All This Time"
Technical
Marc DeSisto, Shelly Yakus - recording, mixing
Larry Vigon - painting
Eugene Pinkowski - photography

Charts

References

External links

Ivan Neville albums
1988 debut albums
Albums produced by Danny Kortchmar
Polydor Records albums